A501 may refer to:

 A501 RAM/RTC expansion, a computer peripheral
 A501 road (Great Britain), a part of the Inner Ring Road, London
 A501 steel
 RFA Salvigil (A501), a ship